is a Japanese footballer currently playing as a winger for Kyoto Sanga, on loan from Sagan Tosu.

Career statistics

Club
.

Notes

References

2000 births
Living people
Association football people from Tochigi Prefecture
Ryutsu Keizai University alumni
Japanese footballers
Association football midfielders
J1 League players
Sagan Tosu players
Kyoto Sanga FC players